Hubert Boales (born c. 1931) is a former American football, baseball, and golf coach. He served as the head football coach at the McNeese State University in 1982, compiling a record of 4–6–1.  Boales was also the head baseball coach at McNeese State from 1968 to 1977 and the school's head golf coach from 1978 to 1981 and again from 1989 to 1993.

Boales was born in Florence, Texas and attended Sam Houston State Teachers College—now known as Sam Houston State University—where he played college baseball as a pitcher from 1953 to 1955.  Before coming to McNeese State in 1967 as assistant football and head baseball coach, Boales coached football, basketball, and baseball at Jasper High School in Jasper, Texas.

Head coaching record

College football

References

Year of birth missing (living people)
1930s births
Living people
Baseball pitchers
McNeese Cowboys baseball coaches
McNeese Cowboys football coaches
Sam Houston Bearkats baseball players
College golf coaches in the United States
High school baseball coaches in the United States
High school basketball coaches in Texas
High school football coaches in Texas
People from Williamson County, Texas
Baseball players from Texas